The Dong-A Ilbo (literally East Asia Daily) is a newspaper of record in Korea since 1920 with a daily circulation of more than 1.2 million and opinion leaders as its main readers. The Dong-A Ilbo is the parent company of Dong-A Media Group (DAMG), which is composed of 11 affiliates including Sports Dong-A, Dong-A Science, DUNet, and dongA.com, as well as Channel A, general service cable broadcasting company launched on 1 December 2011. It covers a variety of areas including news, drama, entertainment, sports, education, and movies.

The Dong-A Ilbo has partnered with international news companies such as The New York Times of the United States of America, The Asahi Shimbun of Japan and The People's Daily of China. It has correspondents stationed in five major cities worldwide including Washington D.C., New York, San Francisco, Beijing, Tokyo, Cairo and Paris. It also publishes global editions in 90 cities worldwide including New York, London, Paris and Frankfurt.

History

Dong-A Ilbo was established in 1920  with the motto of "For the people, democracy and culture." These ideas have transformed into what the company named "Dong-A DNA" which calls for critical view of authority, journalistic integrity in reporting the truth, humanism by sharing the pain of the neglected and being revolutionary by not fearing change.

 1920-04-01: Published the first issue along with the civilization policy of Governor-General of Korea
 1920-09-25: The first suspension for indefinite period of time: for printing the article "Discussing the Problems with Rituals" which were critical of three items sacred to Japan
 1926-03-06: The second suspension for printing a message celebrating the March 1 protest 
 1930-04-16: The third suspension for printing "The Dong-A Ilbo Plays an Important Role in Chosun's Current Situation" which was a letter sent by a press in US in support of Korea
 1931-03-21: Held the 1st Dong-A Marathon Games, Korea's first marathon race
 1936-08-29: The fourth suspension: for erasing the Japanese flag from Korean born Olympic gold medalist
 1940-08-10: Forced closure by the Japanese government
 1945-12-01: Re-opening of Dong-A Ilbo
 1961-03-15: Articles were printed criticizing the legitimacy of the May 15 election (lead to the April revolution)
 1963-03-17: Published newspaper without editorials in protest to the continued military rule
 1963-04-25: Opened Dong-A Broadcasting Station. The first media company to own print and broadcast media
 1964-07-15: Establishment of Children's Dong-A
 1967-01-28: Establishment of Dong-A Annual
 1971-08-17: Staff reporters receive Korea Reporter's Award
 1974-10-24: Announced the Free Press Declaration
 1974-11-20: Awarded for efforts made in freedom of speech by US Freedom House
 1974-12-20: Published blank advertisements in protest of the tyrannical military administration's advertisement oppressions 
 1975-04-18: Dong-A Ilbo President Sang-man Kim receives Press Freedom Golden Pen award
 1980-11-30: Dong-A Broadcasting Station closed due to the mandatory merger by the military government forces
 1984-04-01: Establishment of Dong-A Music (magazine)
 1986-01-01: Establishment of Dong-A Science
 1987-01-16: Exclusively reported the torture and death of Park Jong-chul, which acted as a catalyst for the June democracy uprising
 1993-04-01: Changed from an evening newspaper to a morning newspaper
 1994-03-21: Established Ilmin (People's) Culture Foundation
 1996-10-01: Began internet news service: DongA.com
 1996-12-19: Ilmin Museum of Art opened in the former Dong-a Ilbo newspaper building
 2000-01-01: Moves into Dong-A Media Centre in the Gwanghwamun area
 2000-12-15: Newspaper museum "Presseum" opened
 2001-07-01: World edition of paper printed in over 90 cities
 2002-01-01: Starting of Dong-A Ilbos mobile services
 2002-01-04: The first Korean newspaper company to publish the weekend section, Weekend
 2003-04-01: Introduced the Knowledge Management System (KMS), 'Genie'.
 2005-07-15: On and Off-line Newsroom unifies
 2005-08-17: Begins printing 32 pages of Dong-a Ilbo in color

Feminist movement
In 1933, Dong-A Ilbo launched The New Women (later to become Dong-A Women.) The publication held events such as cooking schools and wives’ picnic providing women a place to socialize outside of the home. Articles such as “The New Woman and Education”, “Liberation of Women and the Nuclear Family” and “Women and Career” were printed to stimulate women's participation in society and the development of women's rights. Dong-A Ilbo also hosted athletic events for women. “Women’s National Tennis Competition” is Korea's and Dong-As oldest contest ever to be held.

Forced closure: Erasing of Japanese flag
In 1939 when World War II erupted, the Japanese government began a campaign to unify Korea and Japan as a culture. This meant the suppression of much of Korea's cultural identity.

After four attempts to close DongA Ilbo and other numerous occasions of inspection, censorship, seizure and deletion, the Japanese government succeeded in August 1940. The Dong-A Ilbo built Dong-A Broadcasting System. Under the Chun Doo-hwan regime, South Korea's media policy had changed. The regime had closed several radio and TV networks and DBS was forced to give most of its shares to the government. The Dong-A Ilbo gave up DBS in 1980.

The event that made forced closure possible was Dong-A Ilbos deliberate obscuration of the Japanese flag in a photograph of the first ever Korean Olympic Gold medalist.

Sohn Kee-Chung won the gold medal in marathon at the 11th Summer Olympics in Berlin (1936); however, because Korea was under Japanese rule, his uniform featured the Japanese flag. The article showed pride for the Korean athlete and featured a smudged Japanese flag to promote nationalistic ideas. Lee Kil-yong (aged 37 at that time), a Dong-A Ilbo journalist who was in charge of athletics, Lee Sang-beom, a painter, photographers, and editors worked together to erase the Japanese flag on the chest of the uniform of Sohn Kee-jeong from the photograph of Sohn standing atop the honor platform for the Olympic medal ceremony. The morning after the picture was published in the newspaper, about 10 journalists of Dong-A Ilbo were hauled off to the police station where they were beaten and tortured.

Changes in disposition from liberal to conservative media
In the early days, the Dong-A Ilbo passively resisted Japanese colonialism and showed liberalism and Korean nationalism tendencies. In addition, since the establishment of the South Korean government in 1948, it has been a liberal media that disagrees with socialism and opposes Syngman Rhee or Park Chung-hee's far-right dictatorship.

The Dong-A Ilbo began the "Liberal Press Protection Fight" in 1970. In December 1974, there was a "". The Park Chung-hee administration suppressed the Dong-A Ilbo, which was very hostile to him, threatened companies to prevent them from posting advertisements in the Dong-A Ilbo, which caused the Dong-A Ilbo to suffer from severe financial difficulties. Eventually, Dong-A Ilbo's executives fired some of the anti-government journalists on March 8, 1975. At this time, journalists who were fired will launch Hankyoreh. Since then, the Dong-A Ilbo has changed its tone to a right-wing conservative media.
 
The paper is considered a newspaper of record in Korea.

Awards and recognition
 Receives Korea's Best Brand Award (2006) 
 Dong-A Ilbo President Sang-man Kim receives Press Freedom Golden Pen award (1975) 
 Awarded for efforts made in freedom of speech by US Freedom House (1974) 
 Staff reporters receive Korea Reporter's Award (1971)

Company
Readership
 Circulation: over 52 million
 About 51% of the readers are in their 30s - 40s
 Over 50% of the readers live in metropolitan area
 55% of the readers are university educated or higher

International partnerships
Dong-A Ilbo has partnered with internationally acclaimed news companies such as the New York Times and Reuters. They share information including articles and video clips. Dong-A Ilbo also prints global editions in 90 cities such as Washington DC, London, Paris, Frankfurt, etc., and has 22 branches worldwide including LA, Vancouver, Osaka. It also has international correspondents stationed in 6 cities with New York, Tokyo, and Beijing among them. Also, the digital edition of the paper is available in English, Japanese and Chinese. 
 Partnership: The Times (UK)
 Asahi Shimbun (Japan)
 People's Daily (China)
 Izvestia (Russia)
 Sydney Morning Herald (Australia)

Publishing
Dong-A Ilbo also has an active publishing sector which produces magazines and books. There are four monthly magazines, two weekly magazines and one annual magazine. The literature sector concentrates on translating and distributing foreign material and also creating domestic content. DongA Books has brought to Korea many international bestsellers and award-winning literature as well as creating million sellers on its own.

 Magazines: Shin Dong-A (Current events magazine) 
 Women's Dong-A (Women's magazine)
 Dong-A Science (Popular science magazine)
 Dong-A Science KIDS
 Weekly Dong-A
 Weekend
 Dong-A Annual
 Books'''
 Interpreter of Maladies by Jhumpa Lahiri (a Pulitzer winning fiction)
 A Walk in the Woods by Bill Bryson (an international bestseller)
 Sponge series (Korean content) has sold over a million copies

New and multi-media servicesDong-A Ilbo has been investing in many ventures that integrate technology into the method of spreading the news. First was the establishment of DongA.com which is the online version of the paper with much more content. It provides space for discussion and submission by the readers. From the success of the on-line content, the company also started its mobile services allowing readers to seek out the news wherever and whenever they are. With recent partnership with Reuters, Dong-A aims to add multimedia services to its methods. With raw video feeds from Reuters which Dong-A has the right to edit for its own use, DongA.com aims to reach its readers through text, images and video.

Community serviceDong-A Ilbo has always recognized its responsibility as a public corporation. As stated in Dong-A DNA, humanism is a great part of Dong-A Ilbo. 
It has a Culture & Sports Operations department (New Project Bureau) that works to raise awareness of different areas in arts and sports as well as promote healthy lifestyles.
The company also has many foundations and scholarships for the less fortunate students in the country.

ArtsDong-A Ilbo holds annual competition of high quality as well as hosting many cultural exhibitions.
 International Music Concours
 Dong-A Theatre Awards
 DongA-LG International Animations Competition
 Rembrandt and 17th Century Netherland Painters Exhibition (2007)
and more

SportsDong-A Ilbo hosts annual competitions for various sports of different levels. It first began its program to raise awareness and help promote areas in sports that were less popular.
 Seoul International Marathon
 High School Baseball Tournament
 Dong-A Swim Meet
and more

EducationDong-A holds annual competitions to help the brightest students. Other sectors such as Dong-A Science has its own educational program which also holds competitions to award the talented.
 National English Competition (University & high school division)
 National Scientific Essay Contest (hosted by DongA Science)

CharityDong-A Ilbo'' has established many foundations and scholarships for students and children of less fortunate circumstances. It has also established a foundation which promotes peace and culture. 
 Dong-A Dream Tree's Foundation: Scholarship foundation
 Inchon Foundation: Founded in celebration of Kim, Sung-soo. Scholarship foundation.
 21st Century Peace Foundation: Promotes peace and harmony between North and South Korea through various means of communication and more

Criticism

See also

Presseum
Ilmin Museum of Art
List of newspapers in South Korea
Communications in South Korea
Channel A (Korea)

References

External links

 

Conservative media in South Korea
The Hankyoreh
Jongno District
Korea under Japanese rule
Korean-language newspapers
Daily newspapers published in South Korea
Newspapers established in 1920
1920 establishments in Korea
Right-wing newspapers